Astros (Greek: Άστρος ) is a town near the Argolic Gulf in the northeast Peloponnese in eastern Arcadia. It is the seat of North Kynouria municipality (Greek: Βόρεια Κυνουρία) and is accessible by the road connecting Corinth and Argos to the south. Its port, Paralio Astros lies 4 km to the northeast of the inland town.

History
The name of the town, built during the Greek War of Independence, is supposed to be taken from the ancient settlement Astron, mentioned in Ptolemy's Geography.

Astros was the site of the Second National Assembly of the Hellenes during the Greek War of Independence, under the presidency of Petros Mavromichalis.  This assembly produced the first constitution of Modern Greece.

The town
The town has an elementary school, a high school, two lyceums, a number of churches including one which is situated on a hilltop, banks and a post office. There is a health clinic on the road to Leonidio.  There is a number of public squares, the most westerly of which contains a small amphitheater built into the hillside.

Geography

Geology

Astros is located in east-central Peloponnese. Much of its land is rocky and bushy and unsuitable for cultivation, but there are some farms and groves in low-lying areas near town.

Climate
It has a Mediterranean climate with hot and dry summers and mild winters. The rain falls mostly in the winter, with relatively little rain in the summer. This location is classified as Csa by Köppen climate classification.

See also
Paralio Astros
Lepida Gorge
List of settlements in Arcadia

External links
Astros from the University of Patras
Περιφέρεια Πελοποννήσου

References

Populated places in Arcadia, Peloponnese